Euvaldo José de Aguiar Neto (born September 17, 1982, in Salvador, Bahia), known as Neto Baiano, is a Brazilian footballer who plays for Brasiliense FC as a forward.

His previous clubs include Paulista, Fortaleza, Atlético-PR, Palmeiras, Jeonbuk Hyundai in South Korea, Mogi Mirim, Internacional, Becamex Bình Dương in Vietnam, São Caetano, Corinthians-AL, Mirassol, Vitória and JEF United Chiba, Kashiwa Reysol in Japan.

Honours 
Internacional
 Campeonato Gaúcho: 2004

Vitoria
 Campeonato Baiano: 2009

Goiás
 Campeonato Goiano: 2013

Sport Recife
 Copa do Nordeste: 2014
 Campeonato Pernambucano: 2014

CRB
 Campeonato Alagoano: 2016, 2017

References

External links 

1982 births
Brazilian footballers
Brazilian expatriate footballers
Association football forwards
Living people
Mirassol Futebol Clube players
Associação Desportiva São Caetano players
Sport Club Internacional players
Mogi Mirim Esporte Clube players
Jeonbuk Hyundai Motors players
K League 1 players
Sociedade Esportiva Palmeiras players
Paulista Futebol Clube players
Club Athletico Paranaense players
Fortaleza Esporte Clube players
Clube Atlético Bragantino players
Esporte Clube Vitória players
Ipatinga Futebol Clube players
Goiás Esporte Clube players
Sport Club do Recife players
Brasiliense Futebol Clube players
Campeonato Brasileiro Série A players
Campeonato Brasileiro Série B players
Campeonato Brasileiro Série C players
J1 League players
J2 League players
JEF United Chiba players
Kashiwa Reysol players
Expatriate footballers in South Korea
Expatriate footballers in Vietnam
Expatriate footballers in Japan
Brazilian expatriate sportspeople in South Korea
Brazilian expatriate sportspeople in Japan
Brazilian expatriate sportspeople in Vietnam
Sportspeople from Salvador, Bahia